Manuel Bulnes Prieto (December 25, 1799 – October 18, 1866) was a Chilean military and political figure. He was twice President of Chile, from 1841 to 1846 and from 1846 to 1851.

Born in Concepción, he served as the president of Chile between 1841 and 1851.  At the age of 16 he was imprisoned as a revolutionary by the Spanish authorities, but was soon released, and in 1818 joined the army of San Martin under whom he served as colonel throughout the Chilean War of Independence.  After three years of continuous warfare (1820–23), he accomplished the temporary conquest of the Araucanian Indians.  He was appointed brigadier general in 1831. In 1832 he crossed the Cordillera and defeated decisively the Pincheira brothers in the battle of Epulafquén. Then Bulnes commanded  the Chilean army in 1838 against Gen. Santa Cruz in Peru; and, after taking Lima and winning the battles of Huaraz and Puente del Buin, combined his forces with those of Gamarra and defeated Santa Cruz at the Battle of Yungay (January 19, 1839), thus putting an end to the confederation between Peru and Bolivia.

Presidency (1841–1851)
His presidencies were characterised by educational and cultural expansion, supported by the encouragement of foreign intellectuals to come to Chile.   The National Institute was reformed and several junior schools were established along with the José Abelardo Núñez Upper School.   In Santiago the University of Chile was founded during his watch, in 1842, as well as a technical training school from which the University of Santiago is descended.

Bulnes also presided over a general amnesty in order to reconcile the groups who had opposed one another in the Civil War of 1829.

Regarding the nation's strategic goals, Bulnes founded Fuerte Bulnes in 1843 in order to establish and enforce sovereignty over the Magellan Straits.   The settlement was relocated to Punta Arenas six years later because the original site offered insufficient space for the development of a settled community:  it was and remains the most southerly municipality in the world, and has been a focus for economic development in the south of the country.   Germans were targeted to colonise the hitherto very sparsely inhabited southern part of Chile in the wake of the 1848 revolutions which provided an impetus for emigration from the European perspective.

It was also during the presidency of Bulnes that the former colonial power, Spain, acknowledged the independence of Chile and became involved in the construction of Chile's first railway.

Manuel Bulnes Prieto died in Santiago.

Cabinet

Sources
 Juan B. Alberdi, Biografia de general Bulnes (Santiago, 1846)
 

1799 births
1866 deaths
People from Concepción, Chile
Conservative Party (Chile) politicians
Presidents of Chile
Members of the Chamber of Deputies of Chile
Members of the Senate of Chile
Candidates for President of Chile
Chilean Army generals
Chilean military personnel of the War of the Confederation
People of the Chilean War of Independence
People of the 1851 Chilean Revolution
Instituto Nacional General José Miguel Carrera alumni
Chilean people of Spanish descent
19th-century Chilean politicians